ICFB, icfb or ICF/B may refer to:

 International Christian Fellowship of Budapest, part of the International Fellowship of Evangelical Students
 icfb, a baseline tag in OpenType feature files 
 "Integrated Circuit Front to Back", a design framework from Cadence Design Systems
 Internally circulating fluidized bed, a kind of fluidized bed